Bangabandhu Sheikh Mujibur Rahman Aviation and Aerospace University  is a public university in Bangladesh. It is funded by the government of Bangladesh and is Bangladesh's first higher education institution on aerospace engineering. Its campus is in Lalmonirhat. The first student admission program began in January 2020.

History 
On July 11, 2018, the UGC drafted a law and submitted it to the Ministry of Education for setting up an aviation university in Bangladesh. At the Council of Ministers meeting on September 28, 2018, the approval for establishing his institution was granted, along with three more universities receiving policy approval on the same day. On February 28, 2019, education minister Dipu Moni placed a bill in the National Parliament regarding the inauguration of this institution and it was passed. A temporary office has been set up at the old airport at Tejgaon, Dhaka to handle the activities of the university. Air Vice-Marshal AHM Fazlul Haque has been appointed as the founding Vice Chancellor of the institution on May 26, 2019. The current Vice Chancellor of the university is Air Vice-Marshal ASM Fakhrul Islam.

List of vice-chancellors 
 Air Vice-Marshal AHM Fazlul Haque (2019 - 2021)
 Air Vice-Marshal Muhammad Nazrul Islam (2021-2022)
 Air Vice Marshal ASM Fakhrul Islam  (2022- present)

Academic outline 
Degree-granting accredited study programs are listed in alphabetic order below:

Undergraduate program 
 Bachelor of Science in Aeronautical Engineering (Aerospace)
 Bachelor of Science in Aeronautical Engineering (Avionics)
 Bachelor of Science in Aircraft Maintenance Engineering (Aerospace)
 Bachelor of Science in Aircraft Maintenance Engineering (Avionics)
 Bachelor of Science in Airport Engineering
 Bachelor of Science in Aviation (Flying)
 Bachelor of Science in Aviation Safety and Security
 Bachelor of Science in Aviation Science (Aerospace and Traffic Management)
 Bachelor of Science in Aviation Operation Management
 Bachelor of Science in Computer Science and Engineering
 Bachelor of Science in Electrical and Electronics Engineering
 Bachelor of Science in Information and Computer Engineering
 Bachelor of Science in Mechanical Engineering
 Bachelor of Social Sciences

Graduate program 
Ongoing graduate programs

 MSc in Aviation Safety and Accident Investigation, Session: 2019-2020 (1st Batch)
 MSc in Aviation Safety and Accident Investigation, Session: 2020-2021 (2nd Batch)
 MBA in Aviation Management, Session: 2019-2020 (1st Batch)
 MBA in Aviation Management, Session: 2020-2021 (2nd Batch)
 LLM in International Air and Space Law, Session: 2020-2021 (1st Batch)

Upcoming graduate programs

 MSc/MEngg in Space Systems Engineering, Session: 2021-2022
     (Commences in June 2022)
 MSc/MEngg in Satellite Communication Engineering, Session: 2021-2022
     (Commences in June 2022)
 MSc/MEngg in Autonomous Systems Engineering, Session: 2022-2023
     (Commences in January 2023)
 MSc/MEngg in Aeronautical Engineering, Session: 2022-2023
     (Commences in January 2023)
 MSc/MEngg in Avionics Engineering, Session: 2022-2023
     (Commences in January 2023)

See also 
 The defense industry of Bangladesh

References 

Technological institutes of Bangladesh
Public universities of Bangladesh
Public engineering universities of Bangladesh
Engineering universities of Bangladesh
Engineering universities and colleges in Bangladesh
Engineering universities and colleges